Cyphomyrmex rimosus is a species of higher myrmicine in the family Formicidae. It is part of the tribe Attini, or fungus-growing ants.

Subspecies
These two subspecies belong to the species Cyphomyrmex rimosus:
 Cyphomyrmex rimosus rimosus g
 Cyphomyrmex rimosus salvini g
Data sources: i = ITIS, c = Catalogue of Life, g = GBIF, b = Bugguide.net

References

Further reading

External links

 

Myrmicinae
Articles created by Qbugbot
Insects described in 1851